Mount Terror is a mountain of the Cascade Range, located in the northwestern corner of Washington in Whatcom County.

Nearby mountains
 Mount Triumph
 Mount Despair
 Mount Degenhardt
 Mount Shuksan
 Mount Blum
 Mount Prophet

Mount Terror is the highest peak of the southern Picket Range. The Pickets, north and south, are considered the most Alpine region of the Cascades. Mount Terror was first climbed in 1932 by William Degenhardt and Herbert Strandberg of the Seattle Mountaineers. Thirty years later Ed Cooper led the first ascent of the more challenging north face.

Climate
Mount Terror is located in the marine west coast climate zone of western North America. Most weather fronts originate in the Pacific Ocean, and travel northeast toward the Cascade Mountains. As fronts approach the North Cascades, they are forced upward by the peaks of the Cascade Range (Orographic lift), causing them to drop their moisture in the form of rain or snowfall onto the Cascades. As a result, the west side of the North Cascades experiences high precipitation, especially during the winter months in the form of snowfall. Due to its temperate climate and proximity to the Pacific Ocean, areas west of the Cascade Crest very rarely experience temperatures below  or above . During winter months, weather is usually cloudy, but, due to high pressure systems over the Pacific Ocean that intensify during summer months, there is often little or no cloud cover during the summer. Because of maritime influence, snow tends to be wet and heavy, resulting in high avalanche danger.

Geology
The North Cascades features some of the most rugged topography in the Cascade Range with craggy peaks, ridges, and deep glacial valleys. Geological events occurring many years ago created the diverse topography and drastic elevation changes over the Cascade Range leading to the various climate differences.

The history of the formation of the Cascade Mountains dates back millions of years ago to the late Eocene Epoch. With the North American Plate overriding the Pacific Plate, episodes of volcanic igneous activity persisted. In addition, small fragments of the oceanic and continental lithosphere called terranes created the North Cascades about 50 million years ago.

During the Pleistocene period dating back over two million years ago, glaciation advancing and retreating repeatedly scoured the landscape leaving deposits of rock debris. The "U"-shaped cross section of the river valleys are a result of recent glaciation. Uplift and faulting in combination with glaciation have been the dominant processes which have created the tall peaks and deep valleys of the North Cascades area.

References

External links
 
North Cascades National Park National Park Service

Mountains of Washington (state)
North Cascades of Washington (state)
Mountains of Whatcom County, Washington
North Cascades National Park